The James J. Hill House in Saint Paul, Minnesota, United States, was built by railroad magnate James J. Hill.  The house, completed in 1891, is near the eastern end of Summit Avenue near the Cathedral of Saint Paul.  The house, for its time, was very large and was the "showcase of St. Paul" until James J. Hill's death in 1916.  It is listed as a U.S. National Historic Landmark, operated by the Minnesota Historical Society. It is also a contributing property to the Historic Hill District.

History
Hill bought three lots on Summit Avenue in 1882, during an era when wealthy citizens were scrambling to build fashionable homes in the neighborhood.  The street offered a commanding view of downtown St. Paul and the Mississippi River area, making it a highly desirable location.  The family previously lived in the Lowertown area in St. Paul, near Ninth and Canada streets.  As new warehouses and railroad tracks crowded the Lowertown residential area, and as Hill's collection of paintings and sculpture overflowed the house, the Hill family thought it was desirable to move.  Hill also realized that recent improvements in home technology, such as electric lighting, plumbing, ventilation, and fireproofing, could be incorporated into a new home.  Moreover, since Hill was becoming a socially prominent person in the community, a new home would stand as a tribute to his status as the "Empire Builder".

The house was designed by an East Coast architectural firm, Peabody, Stearns and Furber, at a time when other homes in the neighborhood were designed by local architects such as Clarence Johnston and Cass Gilbert.  The house was designed in the Richardsonian Romanesque style, with a massive, rugged style featuring randomly sized blocks of stone, sturdy pillars, rounded arches, and a generally strong horizontal emphasis.  Hill supervised the design and construction closely.  As an example, when the Lewis Comfort Tiffany Company submitted designs for the stained glass windows, Hill replied that they were, "anything but what I want," and the job went to A.B. Cutter and Company of Boston.  Later, in 1889, Hill fired the architects because they had overridden his orders to the stonecutters in Massachusetts, and hired the Boston firm of Irving and Casson to finish the project.  The St. Paul Pioneer Press reviewed the house just before it was completed in 1891, writing:

Solid, substantial, roomy, and comfortable is the new home of James J. Hill and family. ... There has been no attempt at display, no desire to flaunt an advertisement of wealth in the eyes of the world.  Just a family home ... impressive, fine, even grand in the simplicity of design, but after all a St. Paul home.

Interior

The interior features an art gallery that housed Hill's collection of painting and sculpture.  It even had a pipe organ, installed after someone suggested to Hill that other wealthy people had pipe organs in their homes.  The house had a hybrid system of gas and electric lighting, with rotary switches on the walls to turn on the electric lights.  However, there were no electrical outlets installed, because during that era electricity was only used for lighting.  The woodwork in the house is very intricate, with hand-carved woodworking in the central hallway, the formal dining room, and the music room.  Other rooms in the house, particularly on the second floor where most of the family members lived, do not have hand carved woodwork, but the woodwork is still richly colored and nicely detailed.

The first floor, in addition to the art gallery, music room, hall, and formal dining room previously mentioned, also had a library, a drawing room, and Mr. Hill's home office.  The second floor contained Mr. and Mrs. Hill's rooms, two guest rooms, and rooms for their five daughters, Gertrude, Rachel, Clara, Ruth, and Charlotte.  The third floor contained rooms for their sons James, Walter, and Louis (who later succeeded his father as president of the Great Northern Railway).  It also had a room that served as a gymnasium and school room for the children, as well as quarters for the servants.

Later history
After James J. Hill died in 1916 and his wife died in 1921, the children eventually moved out.  In 1925, four of the daughters purchased the house from the estate and donated it to the Roman Catholic Archdiocese of Saint Paul and Minneapolis.  The church used it for the next fifty-three years as space for offices, residences, and a teacher's college for women.  The church preserved it well and did not make any significant alterations, although most of the original furniture was sold during this period.  In 1961, the United States Department of the Interior designated the house a National Historic Landmark.  The Minnesota Historical Society acquired the house in 1978, after the Archdiocese consolidated its offices elsewhere.  The house has been restored and is now open for tours.

Photo gallery

See also
List of National Historic Landmarks in Minnesota
National Register of Historic Places listings in Ramsey County, Minnesota

References

External links

 James J. Hill House in MNopedia, the Minnesota Encyclopedia
 James J. Hill House, Minnesota Historical Society
 James J. Hill House Phototour from The Minnesota Historical Society on Flickr
 Minnesota History Quarterly: The James Hill House: Symbol of Status and Security (Summer 1997)
NHL summary

Great Northern Railway (U.S.)
Historic house museums in Minnesota
Houses completed in 1891
Houses in Saint Paul, Minnesota
Houses on the National Register of Historic Places in Minnesota
Individually listed contributing properties to historic districts on the National Register in Minnesota
Minnesota Historical Society
Minnesota state historic sites
Museums in Saint Paul, Minnesota
National Historic Landmarks in Minnesota
National Register of Historic Places in Saint Paul, Minnesota
Peabody and Stearns buildings
Richardsonian Romanesque architecture in Minnesota
Gilded Age mansions